Paul Hammer (13 July 1900 – 25 March 1978) was a Luxembourgian sprinter and long jumper. He competed at the 1920 and the 1924 Summer Olympics.

References

External links
 

1900 births
1978 deaths
Luxembourgian male sprinters
Athletes (track and field) at the 1920 Summer Olympics
Athletes (track and field) at the 1924 Summer Olympics
Luxembourgian male long jumpers
Olympic athletes of Luxembourg